Mark Patrick Hurst (born 18 February 1985) is an English former professional footballer who played in the Football League for Mansfield Town.

References

1985 births
Living people
English footballers
Association football defenders
English Football League players
Mansfield Town F.C. players
Ilkeston Town F.C. (1945) players
Sutton Town A.F.C. players